Actihema simpsonae is a species of moth of the family Tortricidae. It is found in Kenya. The habitat consists of high altitude grassland and mixed scrub.

The wingspan is 16–17 mm. The forewings are off-white, dotted with ochreous. The hindwings are white with fuscous transverse striae.

Etymology
The species is named in memory of Mrs. Jill Simpson.

References

Endemic moths of Kenya
Moths described in 2010
Cochylini
Moths of Africa